Jan Wellens de Cock (c. 1480 – 1527) was a Flemish painter and draftsman of the Northern Renaissance.

Little is known about his life and career. He was probably born in Leiden in Holland but settled in Antwerp. In 1506 Jan is recorded in the archives of the Guild of Saint Luke in Antwerp as having accepted an apprentice called 'Loduwyck'. It is unclear in which year Jan became a master. Jan Wellens de Cock could be identical with a certain 'Jan Van Leyen' (Jan of Leiden) who became a master in 1503–1504. On 6 August 1502 Jan Wellens de Cock married Clara, the daughter of Peter van Beeringen. Jan Wellens de Cock was probably identical to the 'Jan de Cock' that worked as a servant to the guild of 'Onze-Lieve-Vrouw Lof' for which he executed many commissions over the next few years. In 1507 de Cock was paid for painting angels and restoring the Holy Ghost at the altar of this guild in Antwerp Cathedral. These works were probably lost in the "beeldenstorm" of 1566. In 1511 the guild paid de Cock for cutting a woodblock for a print to use in the guild's procession. This is the only indication that de Cock, to whom several prints have been attributed, was indeed active as a block cutter.

In 1520 he was dean of the guild of Saint Luke, together with Joos van Cleve. Jan's artistic activity has been the subject of considerable controversy, and there is not a single work that can be attributed to him with certainty. The attributions made by Friedländer were later refuted by N. Beets and G.J. Hoogewerff. While new attributions have been suggested by many other authors.

He was father to two sons who went on to become fine artists in their own right. Matthys Cock (1505–1548) was a famous painter of landscapes and his brother Hieronymus Cock (1518–1570) originally trained as a painter and landscapist before becoming a prolific publisher and printmaker. As landscape played an important role in the work of both his sons it has often been suggested that the work of de Cock focused on this genre as well. The works attributed to Jan generally belong to the so-called school of Antwerp Mannerism and/or show the influence of Hieronymus Bosch.

Some links to attributed works:
 A triptych with a calvary  in the Rijksmuseum Amsterdam
 A woodcut with the 'Temptation of St. Anthony in the Rijksmuseum Amsterdam
'Lot and his Daughters' in the Detroit Institute of Arts
 'Temptation of St. Anthony in the Fine Arts Museum of San Francisco
 Drawing with the ''Temptation of St. Anthony' in the Metropolitan Museum in New York

References

External links

 'Jan de Cock' in the Getty Union List of Artist Names

16th-century Flemish painters
Dutch Renaissance painters
Flemish Renaissance painters
Painters from Antwerp
Artists from Leiden
1480s births
1527 deaths